Pollution and the Death of Man is an ecological and philosophical work by the American presuppositionalist theologian Francis A. Schaeffer, published in 1970.

Quotations
"...the hippies of the 1960s did understand something. They were right in fighting the plastic culture and the church should have been fighting it too... More than this, they were right in the fact that the plastic culture - modern man, the mechanistic worldview in university textbooks and in practice, the total threat of the machine, the establishment technology, the bourgeois upper middle class - is poor in its sensitivity to nature... As a Utopian group, the counterculture understands something very real, both as to the culture as a culture, but also as to the poverty of modern man's concept of nature and the way the machine is eating up nature on every side".
-Chapter 2

"If God treats the tree like a tree, the machine like a machine, the man like a man, shouldn't I as a fellow-creature, do the same - treating each thing in integrity in its own order? And for the highest reason: because I love God - I love the One who has made it! Loving the Lover who has made it, I have respect for the thing He has made".
-Chapter 4

"The man who believes things are there only by chance cannot give things a real intrinsic value. But for the Christian, there is an intrinsic value. The value of a thing is not in itself autonomously, but because God made it. It deserves this respect as something which was created by God, as man himself has been created by God".
-Chapter 4

Notes

1970 non-fiction books
Books about Christianity
Christianity and environmentalism